Mount Muir is a prominent  glaciated mountain summit located in the Chugach Mountains, in Chugach National Forest, in the U.S. state of Alaska. Although modest in elevation, relief is significant since the southern aspect of the mountain rises from the sea-level Harriman Fiord of Prince William Sound. The mountain's name was officially adopted in 1910 by the United States Geological Survey, probably after conservationist John Muir (1838-1914) who visited the Alaska area four times, including as a member of the 1899 Harriman Alaska expedition that explored this immediate area.

Climate
Based on the Köppen climate classification, Mount Muir is located in a subarctic climate zone with long, cold, snowy winters, and mild summers. Temperatures can drop below −20 °C with wind chill factors below −30 °C. This climate supports the Baker Glacier, Penniman Glaciers, and Detached Glacier on its south slopes, and tributaries of the Colony Glacier on its north, east, and west aspects. May and June are the best months for climbing in terms of favorable weather.

See also

Geography of Alaska

Gallery

References

External links
 Weather: Mount Muir
 Mount Muir Flickr photo

Mountains of Alaska
Landforms of Chugach Census Area, Alaska
North American 2000 m summits